Marine Miroux (born 14 April 1977) is a French architect who lives and works in Berlin.

In 2008, she founded the collective Berlin Süd Architecture with Christoph Hager.

In 2008, with Christoph Hager, she won the Europan 9 competition for their project "Over the Train". In 2010, in partnership with Christoph Hager and Hüller Rudaz Architekten, she received first prize for their project "The Line" in the FLOW competition sponsored by Joël Claisse Architectures, the Urban Land Institute and the businesses of the Port of Brussels. In the same year, she received the  awarded by the French Académie des Beaux-Arts for the project "Better, Cheaper Helping".

References 

People from Fontainebleau
1977 births
Living people
21st-century French architects
French women architects
21st-century French women